Professor Marston and the Wonder Women is a 2017 American biographical drama film about American psychologist William Moulton Marston, who created the fictional character Wonder Woman. The film, directed and written by Angela Robinson, stars Luke Evans as Marston; Rebecca Hall as his legal wife Elizabeth; and Bella Heathcote as the Marstons' polyamorous life partner, Olive Byrne. JJ Feild, Oliver Platt, and Connie Britton also feature.

The film premiered at the 2017 Toronto International Film Festival and was released in the United States on October 13, 2017. It received positive reviews from critics, who praised Robinson's direction, positive portrayal of a committed polyamorous relationship, gentle representation for the BDSM community, and the performances of its stars.

Plot 
The story is told in flashbacks set during a 1945 testimony that William Moulton Marston gives to representatives of the Child Study Association of America. In the year 1928, William and his wife Elizabeth teach and work on their research at the associated Harvard and Radcliffe Colleges. One day, William hires one of his students, Olive Byrne, as a research assistant. Olive aids in the Marstons' work in inventing the lie detector and conducting research on William's DISC theory on human interactions, and the three soon grow close. One after another, tests by the lie detector reveal that they have fallen in love with one another, and all three of them begin to engage in a polyamorous relationship.

As word about their unconventional relationship gets out, the Marstons are fired from the university. Olive reveals that she is pregnant and moves in with the Marstons shortly after. The trio decides to build a family together and create a fabrication to keep secret the nature of their relationship. The family settles in a New York suburb, happily together. By 1934, both Elizabeth and Olive bear children by William (Olive has two sons and Elizabeth has one son and one daughter), telling the neighbors that Olive is a widow and taken in by the Marstons. William starts trying to make a living as an author. Elizabeth takes a job as a secretary and becomes the main breadwinner of the family. Olive stays at home and takes care of the kids, occasionally submitting her writing samples to publishers. They raise their four children together, and Elizabeth names her daughter after Olive.

In 1940, William stumbles upon a lingerie shop in New York City run by Charles Guyette, who introduces him to fetish art themed comics and photos. The art captures William's imagination as a demonstration of his DISC theory. Elizabeth initially disapproves of the art, but she relents during a presentation wherein Olive tries out an outfit that later would be the prototype for Wonder Woman's costume.

After finding limited work as a writer, Marston comes up with the idea of creating a female Amazonian super-heroine for a comic book. The comic would feature his ideas on DISC theory, drawing inspiration from the Marstons' work on the lie detector as well as Elizabeth and Olive in real life, and intend to support the feminist movement to further equal rights for women through a populist medium. He pitches his ideas to Max Gaines, a publisher at National Periodical Publications, who ultimately accepts the comic and suggests simplifying the female superhero's name to "Wonder Woman". Wonder Woman is an instant hit, leading to prosperity for the Marstons/Byrne family. However, one day, their neighbor wanders into their home and witnesses the three of them having sex. This incident leads to their children getting bullied and asked to leave school by the staff. Worried about their children being attacked and ostracized and thinking they have no other choice, Elizabeth reluctantly demands that Olive leave the household with her children. At the same time, the Wonder Woman comic receives accusations of featuring overtly sexual, sadomasochistic, and lesbian imagery that leads to the testimony of the present day.

Leaving the testimony, William collapses and is rushed to the hospital. Learning that he is dying of cancer, William asks Olive to see him and Elizabeth again, trying to help them reconcile. William persuades Elizabeth to submit to Olive as she should not always dominate in their relationship. The Marstons get on their knees and beg for Olive's forgiveness, and Elizabeth tearfully admits that she cannot live without Olive. She eventually agrees to come back to them.

Epilogue text reveals that William died in 1947. Elizabeth and Olive continued to live together as a couple for another 38 years until Olive's death in 1985, and Elizabeth lived to be 100. It also notes that sexual imagery disappeared from the Wonder Woman comic after William's death. However, she kept her powers and had conventional superhero adventures. In 1970 she was subject to a reboot and lost her superpowers; she became a crime fighter and boutique owner. Famous activist Gloria Steinem reclaimed the character in 1972, when she put Wonder Woman on the cover of the first issue of Ms. Magazine as the quintessential symbol of female empowerment.

Cast 
 Luke Evans as William Moulton Marston
 Rebecca Hall as Elizabeth Holloway Marston
 Bella Heathcote as Olive Byrne
 Monica Giordano as Mary
 JJ Feild as Charles Guyette
 Chris Conroy as Brant Gregory
 Oliver Platt as Max Gaines
 Christopher Paul Richards as Teen Donn
 Connie Britton as Josette Frank

Production 
Principal photography on the film began in early October 2016. Annapurna Pictures handles the worldwide rights, while Topple Productions and Boxspring Entertainment produced the film. Amy Redford also produced, along with Terry Leonard.

Release 
The film was released on October 13, 2017, by Annapurna Pictures. It had its world premiere at the 2017 Toronto International Film Festival in September.

Critical response 
On review aggregator website Rotten Tomatoes, the film has an approval rating of 87% based on 181 reviews, and an average rating of 7.3/10. The site's critical consensus reads, "Professor Marston & The Wonder Women winds a lasso of cinematic truth around a fascinating fact-based tale with strong performances from its three stars." On Metacritic, the film has a weighted average score of 68 out of 100, based on reviews from 38 critics, indicating "generally favorable reviews".

In a positive review, David Sims of The Atlantic wrote, "It's genuinely daring how Robinson depicts the evolution of the [trio's] love, from Olive's girlish fascination with William to her deeper infatuation with Elizabeth; this is a film that doesn't fetishize their fluid sexuality and make it a sideshow to be gawked at.” Critic Christy Lemire said the film is "a timely affirmation of feminine power—of the ways in which female wisdom and strength can charge hearts and minds, influence culture and inspire others to be their most authentic selves." Justin Chang of the Los Angeles Times praised the chemistry between the three leads, citing Hall in particular "as Elizabeth moves from furious self-possession toward a humble assertion of a need she didn't know existed."

Reaction of family members 
William and Elizabeth Marston's granddaughter, Christie Marston, criticized the film, saying the idea that Elizabeth and Olive Byrne were lovers was purely fictional. While clarifying that she was not offended by the notion and technically could not "swear" they had no such relationship, she explained that she had been a close, personal confidant of her grandmother's, and she could "say with 99.99% certainty that they did not." While her grandmother's views on sexuality were very progressive, her relationship with Olive had always unambiguously been one of close friendship and mutual dependence. She also noted that despite the film being promoted as a "true story", the family was never consulted for the film, nor did the director attempt to contact them.

Yereth Rosen, granddaughter of Josette Frank, criticized the extremely conservative portrayal of her grandmother in the film, saying "Real Josette was pretty much the opposite of a Focus on the Family-type arch-conservative Christian, for reasons beyond the fact that she was not a Christian."

Accolades 

The film was nominated for a Saturn Award in the category Best Independent Film.

See also 

 Counterstereotype
 Bisexual women
 Portrayal of women in American comics

References

External links 
 

2017 films
2017 biographical drama films
2017 drama films
2017 independent films
2017 LGBT-related films
American biographical drama films
American LGBT-related films
BDSM in films
Biographical films about writers
Cultural depictions of cartoonists
Female bisexuality in film
Films about comics
Films about threesomes
Films set in 1941
Films shot in Massachusetts
Wonder Woman in other media
Films directed by Angela Robinson
Films produced by Andrea Sperling
Annapurna Pictures films
Stage 6 Films films
2010s feminist films
2010s English-language films
2010s American films